The canton of Auray is an administrative division of the Morbihan department, northwestern France. Its borders were modified at the French canton reorganisation which came into effect in March 2015. As a result the number of communes in the canton were reduced from 9 to 7. Its seat is in Auray.

It consists of the following communes:

Auray
Crach
Locmariaquer
Plumergat
Pluneret
Sainte-Anne-d'Auray
Saint-Philibert

References

Cantons of Morbihan